On November 27, 1978, San Francisco Mayor George Moscone and San Francisco Supervisor Harvey Milk were shot and killed in San Francisco City Hall by former Supervisor Dan White. On the morning of that day, Moscone intended to announce that the Supervisor position White resigned from would be given to someone else. White, angered, entered City Hall before the scheduled announcement time and first shot Moscone in the Mayor's office, then Harvey Milk in White's former office space, before escaping the building. Board of Supervisors President Dianne Feinstein first announced Moscone and Milk's deaths to the media, and because of Moscone's death, succeeded him as Acting Mayor of San Francisco.

Dan White was charged with first-degree murder with circumstances that made him eligible for the death penalty. However, in a trial verdict reached on May 21, 1979, White was convicted of the lesser crime of voluntary manslaughter. The verdict sparked the "White Night riots" in San Francisco that evening, and led to the state of California abolishing the diminished capacity criminal defense. It also led to the urban legend of the "Twinkie defense", as many media reports had incorrectly described the defense as having attributed White's diminished capacity to the effects of sugar-laden junk food. White committed suicide in 1985, a year and a half after his release from prison.

Feinstein was elected by the Board of Supervisors to become the first female Mayor of San Francisco on December 4, 1978, a title she would hold for the next ten years. She eventually became a United States Senator for California.

Preceding events
In the mid-1970s, the San Francisco Bay Area and the City of San Francisco in particular was facing a series of bomb threats and actual bombings directed against government targets, largely attributed to the leftist militant New World Liberation Front. These bombings had begun in the Fall of 1975 and continued into 1977. The Mayor of San Francisco and several City Supervisors had had bombs mailed to them and/or had bomb threats made against them, and City Hall itself received threats. On February 9, 1977, new tighter security began at City Hall to protect the Mayor and City Supervisors, including locking most entrances, and providing guards and metal detectors at public entrances, measures which had remained through 1978.

Dan White had been a San Francisco police officer, and then later became a firefighter. He and Milk were each elected to the Board of Supervisors in the November 1977 elections, which introduced district-based seats. The election ushered in "a range of legislators perhaps unmatched in San Francisco history in their diversity", including its first Chinese-American, first unwed mother, first black woman, first homosexual (Milk) and first former firefighter (White). All supervisors were sworn in on January 9, 1978, with Dianne Feinstein as the president of the board. The city charter prohibited anyone from retaining two city jobs simultaneously, so White resigned from his higher paying job with the fire department. During 1978, White would try to supplement his $9,600 a year Supervisor salary with a food concession stand on Pier 39.

With regard to business development issues, the 11-member board was split roughly 6–5 in favor of pro-growth advocates including White, over those who advocated the more neighborhood-oriented approach favored by Mayor Moscone. Debate among the board members was sometimes acrimonious and saw White verbally sparring with other supervisors, including Milk and Carol Ruth Silver. Much of Moscone's agenda of neighborhood revitalization and increased city support programs was thwarted or modified in favor of the business-oriented agenda supported by the pro-growth majority on the Board.

Further tension between White and Milk arose with Milk's vote in favor of placing a group home within White's district. Subsequently, White would cast the only vote in opposition to San Francisco's landmark gay rights ordinance, passed by the Board on April 3, 1978 and signed by Moscone soon after.

White's resignation 
A city charter amendment to raise the salaries of City Supervisors was proposed in the Summer of 1978, and a committee White was on stopped the amendment from going forward, in the context of the then-recent passage of California Proposition 13 in June 1978. The low salary of the Supervisor position took its toll on White, and he finally tendered his resignation to Mayor Moscone on November 10. White stated that he couldn't support his family on only the $9,600 Supervisor salary, and that being forced to work two jobs was preventing him from adequately serving his constituents. His resignation quickly renewed a call to amend the city charter to raise Supervisor salaries, this time proposed in White's name by Carol Ruth Silver. White's resignation would leave an open seat on the Board of Supervisors, a vacancy which would be filled by appointment by Mayor Moscone. This alarmed some of the city's business interests and White's constituents, as it indicated Moscone could tip the balance of power on the Board and appoint a liberal representative for the more conservative district.

On the morning of November 15, five days after resigning, White asked Mayor Moscone to return his letter of resignation (a letter that had already been accepted and filed by the Board of Supervisors) and expressed his intent to continue serving as a Supervisor after receiving loans from family and receiving encouragement from his district's constituents to stay on. Moscone returned the letter, but on November 16, City Attorney George Agnost ruled that White had in fact resigned and was no longer on the Board, pending legal review, and whether White could be appointed back to the position from which he had just resigned was also an open question. Moscone stated that if "legal problems" in the finality of White's resignation arose, he would appoint White back to the seat, but in any case, some of the more liberal city Supervisors and leaders, most notably Milk and Silver, lobbied Moscone not to reappoint him. On November 17, Moscone stated that White's resignation was final, and gave no indication that White was guaranteed to be re-appointed.

On November 18, news broke of the mass deaths of members of Peoples Temple in Jonestown. Prior to the group's move to Guyana, Peoples Temple had been based in San Francisco, so most of the dead were recent Bay Area residents, including Leo Ryan, the United States Congressman who was murdered in the incident. The city was plunged into mourning, and the issue of White's vacant Board of Supervisors seat was pushed aside for several days.

On the 21st, Moscone confirmed that the city's legal position on White was that he had resigned, and further, that filling White's vacancy was a week away. He again made no guarantee of re-appointing White unless he was legally obligated to. White appeared to interpret Moscone's statements to mean that he would be re-appointed to his former position.

Assassinations
San Francisco Mayor Moscone decided to appoint Don Horanzy, a more liberal federal housing official, to the position of District 8 Supervisor, rather than re-appoint Dan White. He scheduled a press conference to make this announcement on November 27, 1978, at 11:30 a.m.; advance copy had been sent to newspapers with late editions so they could begin preparing their stories. White had a former aide drive him to San Francisco City Hall that morning. He was carrying a five-round .38-caliber Smith & Wesson Model 36 Chief's Special loaded with hollow-point bullets, his service revolver from his work as a police officer, with ten extra rounds of ammunition in his coat pocket. White rapped on a basement lab window, and told a building engineer inside that he had misplaced his keys and needed access to City Hall. White climbed into the window at about 10:25 a.m., thereby avoiding metal detectors and guards at public entrances.

George Moscone
White proceeded to the mayor's office, where Moscone was conferring with California State Assemblyman Willie Brown. White requested a meeting with the mayor and was permitted to meet with him after Moscone's meeting with Brown ended.

As White entered Moscone's outer office, Brown exited through another door. Moscone met White in the outer office, where White requested again to be reappointed to his former seat on the Board of Supervisors. Moscone refused, and their conversation turned into a heated argument over Horanzy's pending appointment.

Wishing to avoid a public scene, Moscone suggested they retreat to a private lounge adjacent to the mayor's office, so they would not be overheard by those waiting outside. At approximately 10:45 a.m., as Moscone lit a cigarette and proceeded to pour two drinks, White pulled out his revolver. He then fired shots at the mayor's shoulder and chest, tearing his lung. Moscone fell to the floor and White approached Moscone, pointed his gun  from the mayor's head, and fired two additional bullets into Moscone's ear lobes, killing him instantly. While standing over the slain mayor, White reloaded his revolver. Witnesses later reported that they heard Moscone and White arguing, later followed by the gunshots that sounded like a car backfiring.

Harvey Milk

White left the Mayor's office and hurried across City Hall, toward the shared office space of the Board of Supervisors, inside which Supervisors each had an enclosed cubicle and desk. Dianne Feinstein, who was then President of the San Francisco Board of Supervisors, saw White run past her office door and called after him. White responded with "I have something to do first."

He intercepted Harvey Milk at his office, who was speaking to a radio reporter and friend of his. White interrupted the conversation with a knock, and asked Milk to step inside his former office for a moment. Milk agreed to join him. Once the door to White's office was closed, he positioned himself between the doorway and Milk, and after a brief conversation, opened fire on Milk at 10:55 a.m.. The first bullet hit Milk's right wrist as he tried to protect himself. White continued firing rapidly, hitting Milk twice more in the chest, then fired a fourth bullet at Milk's head, killing him, followed by a fifth shot into his skull at close range.

White fled the scene before Feinstein entered the office where Milk lay dead. She felt Milk's neck for a pulse, her finger entering a bullet wound. Rumors about what had happened circulated, but were not confirmed until about 11:20 a.m. At that time, Feinstein addressed assembled media which had expected the announcement of Don Horanzy as the new District 8 Supervisor. Feinstein was shaking so badly she required support from the police chief while speaking. "As President of the Board of Supervisors, it's my duty to make this announcement. Both Mayor Moscone and Supervisor Harvey Milk have been shot and killed." Gasps, cries, and curses from those assembled interrupted Feinstein briefly, before she continued. "The suspect is Supervisor Dan White."

White left City Hall unchallenged. He took the keys of his former aide's car from her desk, and drove that car to a diner, where he called his wife from a pay phone, and they met at a nearby church. Approximately 30 minutes after leaving City Hall, White turned himself in at the Northern Station SFPD precinct, at which he had previously served as a police officer, to Frank Falzon and another detective, both former co-workers. In a police interrogation room that afternoon, White confessed to shooting Moscone and Milk, but denied premeditation. Part of the taped confession became public in 2014.

Aftermath of the shootings
An impromptu candlelight march started in the Castro leading to the City Hall steps. Tens of thousands attended. Joan Baez led "Amazing Grace", and the San Francisco Gay Men's Chorus sang a solemn hymn by Felix Mendelssohn. Upon learning of the assassinations, singer/songwriter Holly Near composed "Singing for Our Lives", also known as "Song for Harvey Milk".

Moscone and Milk both lay in state at San Francisco City Hall. Moscone's funeral at St Mary's Cathedral was attended by 4,500 people. He was buried at Holy Cross Cemetery in Colma. Milk was cremated and his ashes were spread across the Pacific Ocean. Dianne Feinstein, as president of the Board of Supervisors, acceded to the Mayor's office, becoming the first woman to serve in that office.

The coroner who worked on Moscone and Milk's bodies later concluded that the wrist and chest bullet wounds were not fatal, and that both victims probably would have survived with proper medical attention. However, the head wounds brought instant death without question, particularly because White fired at very close range.

New Mayor and Supervisors 
White's resignation, and all subsequent events including the shootings caused positional changes inside San Francisco city government. At the top two levels, these were:

 Mayor of San Francisco: George Moscone, killed in office November 27, 1978, was immediately succeeded by Board of Supervisors President Dianne Feinstein as Acting Mayor, until elected as Mayor in a vote of 6-2 among remaining active Supervisors (excluding herself) on December 4. Feinstein would serve out the remainder of Moscone's term, then be elected to her first full term as Mayor in November 1979.
 Board of Supervisors President: When Feinstein succeeded to Mayor on December 4, a new president of the board of supervisors needed to be elected. This would be District 2 Supervisor John Molinari, elected by the Board on January 2, 1979.
 Board of Supervisors, District 8: Dan White resigned November 10, 1978. White was replaced by Don Horanzy, Moscone's original choice for District 8, when appointed by Mayor Feinstein on December 7.
 Board of Supervisors, District 5: Harvey Milk, killed in office November 27, 1978. Harry Britt was appointed to District 5 Supervisor by Mayor Feinstein on January 8, 1979.
 Board of Supervisors, District 2: Dianne Feinstein, who succeeded to Mayor on December 4, left a vacancy in her own former Supervisor district position. Feinstein appointed Louise Renne to District 2 on December 18.

Trial and its aftermath

White was charged with first-degree murder with two special circumstances, both of which had been passed into law through 1978 California Proposition 7 only three weeks before White carried out the killings of Moscone and Milk. Specifically, the victim(s) were elected officials of a local government of California and the killing was intentionally carried out in retaliation for or to prevent the performance of the victim(s) official duties; and, more than one murder was committed. Murder with special circumstances meant if convicted, White could face the death penalty.

White's defense team claimed that he was depressed at the time of the shootings, evidenced by many changes in his behavior, including changes in his diet. Inaccurate media reports said White's defense had presented junk food consumption as the cause of his mental state, rather than a symptom of it, leading to the derisive term "Twinkie defense"; this became a persistent myth, despite the fact that neither defense lawyer had argued junk food caused him to commit the shootings and had only mentioned Twinkies in passing. Rather, the defense argued that White's depression led to a state of mental diminished capacity, leaving him unable to have formed the premeditation necessary to commit first-degree murder. The jury accepted these arguments, and White was convicted of the lesser crime of voluntary manslaughter.

The verdict proved to be highly controversial, and many felt that the punishment so poorly matched the deed and circumstances that most San Franciscans believed White essentially got away with murder. In particular, many in the gay community were outraged by the verdict and the resulting reduced prison sentence. Since Milk had been homosexual, many felt that homophobia had been a motivating factor in the jury's decision. This groundswell of anger sparked the city's White Night riots.

The unpopular verdict also ultimately led to changes by the legislature in 1981 and statewide voters in 1982 that ended California's diminished-capacity defense and substituted a somewhat different and slightly more limited "diminished actuality" defense.

White never made a direct statement of remorse, and only one relayed as hearsay was given by a prison duty nurse who attended to White in 1983. He was paroled in 1984 and served this parole in the Los Angeles area, away from San Francisco. Frank Falzon, the homicide detective that took White's statement the day of the murders, said in 1998 that he met with White in 1984, and at that meeting, White confessed that not only was his killing of Moscone and Milk premeditated, but that he had actually planned to kill Silver and Brown as well. Falzon quoted White as having said, "I was on a mission. I wanted four of them. Carol Ruth Silver, she was the biggest snake ... and Willie Brown, he was masterminding the whole thing." After serving his parole, White moved back to the San Francisco area in early 1985, and committed suicide there that October.

San Francisco Weekly has referred to White as "perhaps the most hated man in San Francisco's history".

In the late 1990s, Frank Falzon showed a KTVU reporter some of the evidence that still existed in police custody, including the clothing Dan White had worn, a tape of his police interrogation, Moscone's liquor bottles and glasses from the site of his shooting, and White's original resignation letter to Moscone. The revolver used in the murders, serial number 1J7901, was for a time assumed missing from police evidence storage. An SFPD clerk later confirmed that he had destroyed it "in 1983 or thereabouts" while witnessed by his supervisor, and under a 1982 court order to do so. Its parts were melted down in a foundry that produced manhole covers.

Cultural depictions
Journalist Randy Shilts wrote a biography of Milk in 1982, The Mayor of Castro Street, which discussed the assassinations, trial and riots in detail. The 1984 documentary film The Times of Harvey Milk won the Academy Award for Best Documentary Feature.

Execution of Justice, a play by Emily Mann, chronicles the events leading to the assassinations. The play opened on Broadway in March 1986 and in 1999, it was adapted to film for cable network Showtime, with Tim Daly portraying White.

The Moscone–Milk assassinations and the trial of Dan White were lampooned by the Dead Kennedys with their re-written version of "I Fought the Law" which appeared in their 1987 compilation album Give Me Convenience or Give Me Death. The photo on the front cover of their 1980 album Fresh Fruit for Rotting Vegetables, which shows several police cars on fire, was taken during the White Night riots of May 21, 1979.

The assassinations were the basis for a scene in the 1987 science fiction movie RoboCop in which a deranged former municipal official holds the mayor and others hostage and demands his job back.

In 2003, the story of Milk's assassination and of the White Night Riot was featured in an exhibition created by the GLBT Historical Society, a San Francisco museum, archives and research center to which the estate of Scott Smith donated Milk's personal belongings that were preserved after his death. "Saint Harvey: The Life and Afterlife of a Modern Gay Martyr" was shown in the main gallery in the Society's former Mission Street location. The centerpiece was a section displaying the suit Milk was wearing at the time of his death. The suit is currently on display in the Society's permanent museum space in the Castro.

In 2008 the film Milk depicted the assassinations as part of a biographical story about the life of gay rights activist and politician Harvey Milk. The movie was a critical and commercial success, with Victor Garber portraying Moscone, Sean Penn playing Milk and Josh Brolin playing White. Penn won an Oscar for his performance and Brolin was nominated.

In January 2012, the Berkeley Repertory Theater premiered Ghost Light, a play exploring the effect of Moscone's assassination on his son Jonathan, who was 14 at the time of his father's death. The production was directed by Jonathan Moscone himself and written by Tony Taccone.

See also

List of assassinated American politicians
 List of homicides in California

Notes

References

Further reading

 
 Weiss, Mike (2010). Double Play: The Hidden Passions Behind the Double Assassination of George Moscone and Harvey Milk, Vince Emery Productions. .
 

1978 in California
1978 in LGBT history
1978 in San Francisco
1978 murders in the United States
Assassinations in the United States
Crimes in San Francisco
Harvey Milk
LGBT history in San Francisco
Murder in the San Francisco Bay Area
November 1978 events in the United States
Political history of the San Francisco Bay Area
Violence against gay men in the United States